Shirley Bowler (née Duvigneaud; born October 2, 1949) is a writer and editor who served as a member of the Louisiana House of Representatives from 1992 until term-limited in 2008. A Republican, she represented Louisiana House District 78, which includes her hometown of Harahan, Jefferson Parish in suburban New Orleans. She was succeeded by Representative Kirk Talbot. During much of her House tenure, her District 77 colleague from St. Tammany and Tangipahoa parishes was Diane Winston, a fellow Republican.

Background

Bowler was elected to the House in the nonpartisan blanket primary held in October 1991, when she unseated the one-term Republican Robert T. Garrity, Jr., 8,986 (59.3 percent) to 6,167 (40.7 percent).

In the House, Bowler served on the following committees:
 House Legislative Services Council (of which she was vice-chair)
 Civil Law and Procedure
 Insurance
 Labor and Industrial Relations
 House Special Committee on Disaster Planning – Jefferson Subcommittee (Katrina aftermath)
 House Special Committee on Disaster Planning, Crisis Management, Recovery & Long-Term Revitalization (Katrina aftermath)

On September 11, 2006, Bowler represented the Louisiana Legislative Women's Caucus on the annual convention program of the American Bankers Insurance Association (ABIA) in Washington, D.C. Bowler has also been active in the Louisiana State Law Institute (LSLI), serving on its Bond for Deed Committee and Visitation Committee.

Bowler, a New Orleans native, is a writer and editor. She received her secondary education at Saint Mary's Dominican High School in New Orleans, for which she has been Alumnae Coordinator and Alumnae Association vice president and later became Alum of the Year, an honor bestowed for lifetime achievement and promoting the fundamentals of the school. Her BA degree is from the University of New Orleans. She has additional training as a television advertising producer. From 1971–77, she was a schoolteacher. Bowler was one of the first women admitted to the Harahan Rotary International and has served as the club's vice president, treasurer, and president. 

While in the House, she earned the nickname "The Black Widow" for being the person most likely to kill a colleague's bill. During her last term in office, having accepted the nickname, she purchased 50 gold plated "Black Widow" pins and gave them out to legislators who unknowingly killed a bill that she deemed necessary of rejection. She was also known by most legislators to have read all the bills or at least most of them, and every bill she voted on. Such claims are generally folklore, but it thought that she read more bills than any other legislator during her tenure.

Upon departing the legislature she was appointed to the position of Deputy Commissioner of Management and Finance for the Louisiana Department of Insurance as an appointee of the elected Commissioner, James "Jim" Donelon.

Family
Shirley Duvigneaud married Michael J. Bowler (born April 2, 1948); the couple have three children, and are Roman Catholics.

Notes

1949 births
Living people
American editors
American television journalists
American women television journalists
Republican Party members of the Louisiana House of Representatives
People from Harahan, Louisiana
People from East Baton Rouge Parish, Louisiana
University of New Orleans alumni
Women state legislators in Louisiana
Writers from Louisiana
Catholics from Louisiana
21st-century American women